Wauwatosa (known informally as Tosa; originally Wau-wau-too-sa or Hart's Mill) is a city in Milwaukee County, Wisconsin, United States. The population was 48,387 at the 2020 census. Wauwatosa is located immediately west of Milwaukee, and is a part of the Milwaukee metropolitan area. It is named after the Potawatomi Chief Wauwataesie and the Potawatomi word for firefly.

History
The lush Menomonee Valley of the Wauwatosa area provided a key overland gateway between the rich glacial farmland of southeastern Wisconsin and the Port of Milwaukee. In 1835, Charles Hart became the first Euro-American to settle here, followed that year by 17 other families. The following year a United States Road was built from Milwaukee through Wauwatosa, eventually reaching Madison. Charles Hart built a mill in 1845 on the Menomonee River which gave the settlement its original name of "Hart's Mill." The mill was torn down in 1914.

The Town of Wau-wau-too-sa was created by act of the Wisconsin Territorial Legislature on April 30, 1840. As of the 1840 census, the population of the Town of Wau-wau-too-sa or Wauwatosa was 342. The town government was organized in 1842. The town's borders originally extended from the present-day Greenfield Avenue in the south to Hampton Avenue in the north, and from 27th Street in the east to the Waukesha County line in the west, encompassing sections of present-day Milwaukee, West Milwaukee and West Allis, plus the southern part of former North Milwaukee, which was wholly annexed into the city of Milwaukee in 1927. Most of the town was farmland through the remainder of the 19th century.

In 1849 the Watertown Plank Road was constructed through Wauwatosa, mainly following the old Madison territorial road. In 1851 Wisconsin's first railroad (later The Milwaukee Road) established Wauwatosa as its western terminus. The Village of Wauwatosa was incorporated from the central part of the Town of Wauwatosa in 1892, and was rechartered as the City of Wauwatosa on May 27, 1897.

Expansion 
On November 25, 1952, the City of Wauwatosa more than doubled its size by annexing  of land west of the Menomonee River, the entire remaining portion of the Town of Wauwatosa, which became the home to several large cold storage and regional food distribution terminals. Industrial plants owned by firms including Harley-Davidson and Briggs & Stratton were also constructed.

In the past 40 years, western Wauwatosa has become an edge city with an important commercial and retail district built up along Milwaukee's beltline Highway 100 and anchored by the Mayfair Mall.

Removal of cross
Wauwatosa received some national attention in 1992 when the Wauwatosa Common Council, threatened with a lawsuit, decided to remove a Christian cross from the City's seal adopted in 1957. The cross was replaced with the text, "In God We Trust." The seal itself was designed by 9-year old Suzanne Vallier as an entry in a contest among Wauwatosa schoolchildren. The quadrants of the logo's shield represent, from top left going clockwise; an arrowhead representing the Indians who were the original inhabitants of the city, the mill representing Hart's Mill which was the original name of the city, the cross representing the "city of churches", and the symbol used on street signs representing the "city of homes."

2020 shootings

On February 2, 2020, Alvin Cole, a 17-year-old African-American male, was shot and killed at Mayfair Mall by a police officer responding to a reported disturbance. According to authorities, Cole had been fleeing from police while carrying a stolen handgun. No charges were filed against the officer who fired the fatal shots, sparking protests. 

On November 20, shooting occurred at the mall, leaving eight people injured. The shooter fled the scene afterwards and remained at large for a day, until the arrest of a 15-year-old suspect.

Geography

Eastern Wauwatosa is also known for its homes and residential streets, at one time just a short streetcar ride away from downtown Milwaukee. Prior to the arrival of Dutch elm disease, many of Wauwatosa's older residential streets had large gothic colonnades of American Elm trees. In Wauwatosa, the Menomonee Valley made it easier to quarry portions of the Niagara Escarpment, which provided the necessary materials for cream-colored bricks and limestone foundations used in many homes and public buildings throughout the region.

Climate

Demographics

As of 2000 the median income for a household in the city was $54,519, and the median income for a family was $68,030. Males had a median income of $46,721 versus $35,289 for females. The per capita income for the city was $28,834. About 2.3% of families and 3.8% of the population were below the poverty line, including 3.9% of those under age 18 and 5.5% of those age 65 or over.

2010 census
As of the census of 2010, there were 46,396 people, 20,435 households, and 11,969 families residing in the city. The racial makeup of the city was 89.6% White, 4.5% African American, 0.3% Native American, 2.8% Asian, 0.1% Pacific Islander, 0.6% from other races, and 2.2% from two or more races. Hispanic or Latino of any race were 3.1% of the population.

There were 20,435 households, of which 27.6% had children under the age of 18 living with them, 47.2% were married couples living together, 8.2% had a female householder with no husband present, 3.2% had a male householder with no wife present, and 41.4% were non-families. 34.3% of all households were made up of individuals, and 14.5% had someone living alone who was 65 years of age or older. The average household size was 2.23 and the average family size was 2.92.

The median age in the city was 39.8 years. 21.9% of residents were under the age of 18; 5.8% were between the ages of 18 and 24; 28.9% were from 25 to 44; 26.7% were from 45 to 64; and 16.6% were 65 years of age or older. The gender makeup of the city was 46.6% male and 53.4% female.

Government
Wauwatosa has a mayor–council government. The mayor is elected to a four-year term.

The Common Council is composed of 16 aldermen, two from each of eight districts. They serve four-year terms, with one member from each district up for election every other year. The aldermen set policy and have extensive financial control, but are not engaged in daily operational management.

Politics

Wauwatosa is mostly in the 5th Wisconsin congressional district for the United States House of Representatives, with small parts of northern Wauwatosa in the 4th house district.

Wauwatosa voters have supported Democratic, Republican, and Libertarian candidates.

Education
Wauwatosa is served by the Wauwatosa School District:
 High Schools: Wauwatosa West, Wauwatosa East
 Middle Schools: Whitman, Longfellow
 Elementary Schools: Eisenhower, Jefferson, Lincoln, Madison, McKinley, Roosevelt, Underwood, Washington, Wilson
 Additional school-district services are provided to juvenile residents of the Milwaukee County Grounds—at Children's Hospital of Wisconsin and the Milwaukee County's Children and Adolescent Services Center—through the River Hills School on the Milwaukee County Mental Health Complex grounds. County juveniles in secure detention receive educational services through the Vel R. Phillips Juvenile Justice Center School within the Milwaukee County Children's Court building

Catholic elementary schools in the city include Wauwatosa Catholic, St. Bernard, St. Joseph, St. Jude and Christ King.
Lutheran Schools include Our Redeemer and St. John's.

Points of interest

Wauwatosa contains Milwaukee County's Regional Medical Center, which includes the Medical College of Wisconsin, the Children's Hospital of Wisconsin, and Froedtert Hospital, one of two level-one trauma centers in the state. Other points of interest are the Annunciation Greek Orthodox Church designed by Frank Lloyd Wright; and the Memorial Center, built in 1957, which contains the public library, an auditorium, and the city hall. The Washington Highlands Historic District, a residential neighborhood designed in 1916 by renowned city planner Werner Hegemann, was added to the National Register of Historic Places in 1989, as was the Kneeland-Walker House. The Milwaukee County School of Agriculture and Domestic Economy Historic District, located on a former high school campus, was added in 1998. Other buildings on the list include Wauwatosa's oldest house, the Lowell Damon House; the Thomas B. Hart House; and the Wauwatosa Woman's Club Clubhouse.

In July 2019, the Tourism Commission of Wauwatosa sponsored the installation of several new murals by professional artists. The murals are curated by Milwaukee-based public arts agency Wallpapered City, and the artworks appear on buildings from 64th Street to 70th Street along North Avenue.'

In popular culture
Wauwatosa is the home town of the narrator of an unrecorded song by Bob Dylan, "On, Wisconsin" (not to be confused with the University of Wisconsin fight song of the same name).  The lyrics were written by Dylan in 1961 and finished in 2018 by local musician Trapper Schoepp.  Schoepp wrote music to accompany Dylan's lyrics and recorded the song at Wauwatosa's Wire & Vice studio for his album Primetime Illusion. "In Name and Blood", Episode 2 of Season 3 of the television show Criminal Minds is set in Wauwatosa.

Notable people

 Matt Adamczyk, American businessman and politician
 Antler, poet
 Carole Barrowman, Author and Professor
 William Bast, screenwriter
 Henry S. Berninger, Wisconsin politician and businessman
 Bill Berry, musician
 Fabian Bruskewitz, Bishop of the Roman Catholic Diocese of Lincoln
 Milton F. Burmaster, Wisconsin politician and lawyer
 Matthew Busche, cyclist
 Glenn R. Davis, U.S. Representative
 Fisk Holbrook Day, physician and geologist
 Nancy Dickerson, Peabody Award-winning journalist
 Sarah E. Dickson, was elected first woman Presbyterian elder here
 Anton Falch, professional baseball player
 Charles Fingado, Wisconsin politician
 Charles Thompson Fisher, Wisconsin politician and farmer
 James L. Foley, Jr., Wisconsin politician and farmer
 Albert Fowler, mayor of Rockford, Illinois
 Eric E. Hagedorn, Wisconsin politician and electrical engineer
 Devin Harris, professional basketball player of the NBA
 Judson G. Hart, Wisconsin farmer and politician
 Stephen F. Hayes, author and political commentator
 Julius P. Heil, Wisconsin governor
 Michael W. Hoover, presiding judge of the Wisconsin Court of Appeals
 Mike Huwiler, Olympic athlete, MLS player
 Michael G. Kirby, Wisconsin politician
 Greg Koch, guitarist
 Christian A. Koenitzer, Wisconsin politician
 Mike Krol, musician
 Joseph H. Loveland, Vermont politician
 William Martz, chess International Master
 Joseph McBride, author, film historian
 Ed McCully, Christian missionary killed during Operation Auca
 John Morgridge, former CEO and Chairman of the Board of Cisco Systems
 Walter Nortman, Wisconsin politician
 Charles B. Perry, Wisconsin politician
 Roger Ream, educator
 John E. Reilly, Jr., Wisconsin politician and judge
 Peggy Rosenzweig, Wisconsin politician
 Brad Rowe, actor
 Jeremy Scahill. investigative journalist, author, and director
 Richard Schickel, film critic and author
 William A. Schroeder, Wisconsin politician and lawyer
 Steve Sisolak, Governor of Nevada
 Tony Smith, retired NBA player
 Jerry Smith, professional basketball player
 Andrew Stadler, professional soccer player
 Thomas A. Steitz, Nobel Prize-winning chemist
 Michael Torke, Composer and musician, New York, NY
 Spencer Tracy, Hollywood actor
 Frederick D. Underwood, president of the Erie Railroad
 Scott Walker, 45th Governor of Wisconsin
 Grace Weber, singer and songwriter
 David J. Wineland, Nobel Prize-winning physicist
 George Wylie, Wisconsin farmer and politician

References

External links

 City of Wauwatosa

 
Cities in Wisconsin
Cities in Milwaukee County, Wisconsin
1840 establishments in Wisconsin Territory